The Mars trojans are a group of trojan objects that share the orbit of the planet Mars around the Sun. They can be found around the two Lagrangian points 60° ahead of and behind Mars. The origin of the Mars trojans is not well understood. One theory suggests that they were primordial objects left over from the formation of Mars that were captured in its Lagrangian points as the Solar System was forming. However, spectral studies of the Mars trojans indicate this may not be the case. Another explanation involves asteroids chaotically wandering into the Mars Lagrangian points later in the Solar System's formation. This is also questionable considering the short dynamical lifetimes of these objects. The spectra of Eureka and two other Mars trojans indicates an olivine-rich composition. Since olivine-rich objects are rare in the asteroid belt it has been suggested that some of the Mars trojans are captured debris from a large orbit-altering impact on Mars when it encountered a planetary embryo.

Presently, this group contains 14 asteroids confirmed to be stable Mars trojans by long-term numerical simulations but only nine of them are accepted by the Minor Planet Center (†).

Due to close orbital similarities, most of the smaller members of the L5 group are hypothesized to be fragments of Eureka that were detached after it was spun up by the YORP effect (Eureka's rotational period is 2.69 h). The L4 trojan 1999 UJ7 has a much longer rotational period of ~50 h, apparently due to a chaotic rotation that prevents YORP spinup.

 (leading):
  †

 (trailing):
 5261 Eureka (1990 MB) †
  †
  †

See also 
 Trojan (celestial body)
 Minor planets that orbit near trojan points
 Earth trojan
 Jupiter trojan
 Neptune trojan

References 

 
4